Samuel Asoma (born 15 July 2002) is a Belgian professional footballer who plays as a midfielder for Belgian First Division B side Club NXT.

Club career
Asoma began his career at the youth academy of Club Brugge. On 22 August 2020, he made his debut for Brugge's reserve side, Club NXT in the Belgian First Division B against RWDM47. He started as NXT lost 0–2.

Career statistics

Club

References

External links

2002 births
Living people
Belgian footballers
Association football midfielders
Club NXT players
Challenger Pro League players